Frederika "Friedl" Dicker-Brandeis (30 July 1898, in Vienna – 9 October 1944, in Auschwitz-Birkenau), was an Austrian artist and educator murdered by the Nazis in the Auschwitz-Birkenau extermination camp.

Biography
Frederika Dicker was born in Vienna on 30 July 1898, into a poor Jewish family. Her father was a shop-assistant; her mother, Karolina, died in 1902.
She married Pavel Brandeis in 1936 and used the hyphenated surname after that. Dicker-Brandeis was a student of Johannes Itten at his private school in Vienna, and later followed Itten to study and teach at the Weimar Bauhaus. She was involved in the textile design, printmaking, bookbinding, and typography workshops there from 1919-1923. After leaving the Bauhaus, she worked as an artist and textile designer in Berlin, Prague, and Hronov. Dicker-Brandeis wrote to a friend in 1940:

In World War II
Dicker-Brandeis and her husband, Pavel Brandeis, were deported to the Terezín "model ghetto" on December 17, 1942. During her time at Terezín, she gave art lessons and lectures with art supplies she smuggled into the camp. She helped to organize secret education classes for the 600 children of Terezín. She saw drawing and art as a way for the children to understand their emotions and their environment. Dicker-Brandeis insisted that each child must sign their own name, not allowing them to become invisible or anonymous.  In this, she persisted in pursuing her goal "to rouse the desire towards creative work."

In September 1944, Brandeis was transported to Auschwitz. Dicker-Brandeis volunteered for the next transport to join him. Before she was taken away, she entrusted Raja Engländerova, chief tutor of Girls' Home L 410, with two suitcases containing 4,500 drawings. Dicker-Brandeis was murdered in Birkenau on 9 October 1944. Her husband survived.

Legacy
After the war, Willy Groag, director of the Girls' home L 410, brought the suitcases with children's drawings to the Jewish Community in Prague. From the nearly 660 authors of the drawings, 550 were killed in the Holocaust. The drawings are now in the Jewish Museum in Prague's collection, with some on display in the Pinkas Synagogue.

In 1999, an exhibition of Dicker-Brandeis' work, organized by the Simon Wiesenthal Center and curated by Elena Makarova of Israel, opened in Vienna. It then toured to the Czech Republic, Germany, Sweden, France, USA, and Japan. Tokyo Fuji Art Museum founder Daisaku Ikeda, who was instrumental in bringing the exhibit to Japan, commented:

Her work was included in the 2019 exhibition City Of Women: Female Artists in Vienna from 1900 to 1938 at the Österreichische Galerie Belvedere.

Gallery

Notes

Bibliography 
 Susan Goldman Rubin: Fireflies in the Dark: The Story of Friedl Dicker-Brandeis and the Children of Terezin, Holiday House Inc New York, 2000, 
 Elena Makarova: ''Friedl, Dicker-Brandeis, Vienna 1898- Auschwitz 1944: the artist who inspired the children's drawings of Terezin ", 1st edition. Tallfellow/Every Picture Press, in association with Simon Wiesenthal Center/Museum of Tolerance, Los Angeles, 2001,

External links 
 
 Entry in Jewish Women: A Comprehensive Historical Encyclopedia
 More about Friedl Dicker-Brandeis
 The Pinkas Synagogue
 Exhibition Tokyo Fuji Art Museum April 2002
 Jewish Museum (1109 Fifth Avenue, New York City) from September 10, 2004 to January 16, 2005
 http://makarovainit.com/friedl/home.html
 https://web.archive.org/web/20101215004606/http://www.jewishmuseum.cz/en/afdb.htm
 https://web.archive.org/web/20140116202409/http://www.thejewishmuseum.org/exhibitions/FDB
 Documents about Friedl Dicker-Brandeis in the collection of the Jewish Museum Prague.
 about Friedl Dicker-Brandeis in Yad Vashem website

See also 
 Anni Albers
 Gunta Stölzl
 Margaretha Reichardt
 Otti Berger

1898 births
1944 deaths
Austrian people who died in Auschwitz concentration camp
Bauhaus alumni
Austrian expatriates in Germany
Austrian expatriates in Czechoslovakia
Czech Jews
Jewish artists
Artists from Vienna
Theresienstadt Ghetto prisoners
Austrian civilians killed in World War II
Austrian women painters
20th-century Austrian women artists
Austrian Jews who died in the Holocaust
Jewish women artists